This is a list of Russian artists. In this context, the term "Russian" covers the Russian Federation, Soviet Union, Russian Empire, Tsardom of Russia and Grand Duchy of Moscow, including ethnic Russians and people of other ethnicities living in Russia. This list also includes those who were born in Russia but later emigrated, and those who were born elsewhere but immigrated to the country and/or worked there for a significant period of time.

Alphabetical list


A

B

C

D

E

F

G

H

I

J

K

L

M

N

O

P

R

S

T

U

V

W

Y

Z

See also
 Russian Academy of Arts
 List of 19th-century Russian painters
 List of 20th-century Russian painters
 List of Russian landscape painters
 List of painters of Saint Petersburg Union of Artists
 :Category:Russian artists
 List of Russian architects
 List of Russian inventors
 List of Russian explorers
 List of Russian language writers
 Russian culture

Artists

Russian